is a lighthouse in Cape Sata on the Ōsumi Peninsula, in the town of Minamiōsumi, Kagoshima, Japan.

History
This lighthouse was designed by Richard Henry Brunton who was hired by the government of Japan at the beginning of the Meiji period to help construct lighthouses to make the country safe for foreign ships.

See also

 List of lighthouses in Japan

References

Lighthouses completed in 1871
Lighthouses in Japan
Buildings and structures in Kagoshima Prefecture